Veli Kaarlo Merikoski (2 January 1905 in Pyhtää – 28 January 1982 in Helsinki) 
was a professor at the University of Helsinki and once the Minister for Foreign Affairs representing People's Party.

Merikoski worked as an associate professor of administrative courts in the University of Helsinki 1937–1941. From 1941 to 1970 he was a professor. He was also a chancellor in the Turku School of Economics and a member in the Permanent Court of Arbitration in the Hague.

Kekkonen appointed Merikoski with the task to form a new government following the 1962 parliamentary elections. However, Merikoski was not successful in this task, and Ahti Karjalainen replaced him. Merikoski was the Minister of Foreign Affairs in the Ahti Karjalainen's cabinet on the mandate of People's Party.

References

1905 births
1982 deaths
People from Pyhtää
People from Viipuri Province (Grand Duchy of Finland)
People's Party of Finland (1951) politicians
Ministers for Foreign Affairs of Finland
Finnish legal scholars
Members of the Permanent Court of Arbitration
Academic staff of the University of Helsinki
Finnish judges of international courts and tribunals